Jan José De Brandt (born 20 January 1959) is a Belgian former volleyball player and current coach. He last coached for Fenerbahçe for 2017-18 season, before getting fired during playoffs. He also coached Fenerbahçe Acıbadem between mid of 2008-09 season to 2009–2010 season end, and led to win Women's Volleyball League and Volleyball Super Cup. He played volleyball between years 1967–1978 as a professional player and formerly coached CV Tenerife and Belgian national teams. He is married and has a son and a daughter who both also play volleyball. He speaks fluently Dutch, French, German and English.

Honours
 Women's European Volleyball League:
  Winner (1): 2015
 Women's CEV Champions League:
  Second (1): 2009–10
 Women's CEV Top Teams Cup:
 Third (1): 2008–09
 Turkish Women's Volleyball League:
  Winners (2): 2008-09, 2009–10
 Turkish Cup:
  Winner (1): 2009-10
 Turkish Super Cup:
  Winner (1): 2009

References

Belgian men's volleyball players
Belgian volleyball coaches
Fenerbahçe volleyball coaches
Living people
1959 births